James Vincent Russo (born April 23, 1953) is an American film and television actor. He has appeared in over 150 films in three decades.

Early life
Russo was born in New York City, New York, to an Italian father and German mother. A graduate of the High School of Art and Design and New York University (NYU), he wrote and starred in the prize-winning short film The Candy Store. Before his first break in acting, he drove for a cab company, worked as a construction worker and a gravedigger. He was raised in Flushing, New York and spent his formative years on 156th street.

Career
Russo's first role in his acting career was in the 1981 made-for-television film Chicago Story. He then went on to star in many hit films of the 1980s.

His big break (but small role) came in the 1982 comedy film Fast Times at Ridgemont High, as a convenience store robber. In 1984, he appeared in Beverly Hills Cop as Mikey Tandino, a friend of Axel Foley who is murdered. That same year he starred in The Cotton Club and played small-time hood Bugsy in Sergio Leone's Once Upon a Time in America. Russo's other big role was as a brutal rapist in the 1986 drama Extremities, opposite Farrah Fawcett. He starred in the 1988 drama-suspense-thriller film Freeway.

Russo's film roles in the 1990s include State of Grace (1990), A Kiss Before Dying (1991), and My Own Private Idaho (1991). Russo also had roles in the 1994 Western Bad Girls, the 1997 films The Postman, and Donnie Brasco. In 2009 he had a small role in Michael Mann's Public Enemies as a member of John Dillinger's gang.

In 2003, Russo was reunited with his co-star from The Postman, Kevin Costner, in the Western film Open Range. He made guest appearances in many TV dramas and films, including The Equalizer, Miami Vice, CSI, CSI: Miami, and Las Vegas.

In the summer of 2009, Russo starred in the psychological thriller 7E with Brendan Sexton III, John Savage and Natasha Lyonne. The film was released on December 10, 2013. Russo had a supporting role in Quentin Tarantino's 2012 film Django Unchained.

In 2011, Russo provided video game voice talent for Rage and provided additional voice work for Star Wars: The Old Republic.

He appeared on Bastille's music video for "Of the Night".

Filmography

Film

Television

Video games

Stage

Music videos

Awards

References

External links
 
 
 
 James Russo (Aveleyman)

1953 births
Living people
American male film actors
American male television actors
Male actors from New York City
20th-century American male actors
21st-century American male actors
New York University alumni
People from Flushing, Queens
American people of Italian descent
American people of German descent